Hide-Out is a 1930 American pre-Code drama film directed by Reginald Barker and written by Lambert Hillyer, Arthur Ripley and Matt Taylor. The film stars James Murray, Kathryn Crawford, Carl Stockdale, Lee Moran, Guy Edward Hearn and Robert Elliott. The film was released by Universal Pictures in April 1930.

Plot
A bootlegger in trouble with the law hides out on a college campus. He disguises himself as a student, but soon becomes the school's star athlete and most popular man on campus. The film contains some action scenes, "including an eight-oared shell race". Other settings include a banquet, a train, and a speakeasy.

Cast 
James Murray as Jimmy Dorgan
Kathryn Crawford as Dorothy Evans
Carl Stockdale as Dorgan
Lee Moran as Joe Hennessey
Guy Edward Hearn as Coach Latham
Robert Elliott as William Burke
Jack Hanlon as Jerry 
George Hackathorne as Atlas
Sarah Padden as Mrs. Dorgan
Jane Keckley as Mrs. Evans
Richard Carlyle as Dean

References

External links
 

1930 films
1930s English-language films
American drama films
1930 drama films
Universal Pictures films
Films directed by Reginald Barker
American black-and-white films
1930s American films